Operation Backfire was a military scientific operation during and after the Second World War that was performed mainly by British staff. The operation was designed to completely evaluate the entire V-2 rocket assembly, interrogate German personnel specialized in all phases of it and then to test and launch missiles across the North Sea.

Background
With the end of the war, the Allies' scrambled to acquire German technology. For their part, a number of operations were set by the British, with the Fedden Mission and Operation Surgeon. With the consent of U.S. General Dwight D. Eisenhower, the operation was orchestrated by Major Robert Staver from the Rocket Section of the Research and Development branch of the Ordnance Office that was tasked in directing the effort to find and interrogate the German rocket specialists who had built the V-2. Since April 30 he had been in the Nordhausen area searching the smaller laboratories for V-2 technicians. Auxiliary Territorial Service (ATS) Junior Commander Joan Bernard would also play a role in this operation.

Backfire

The Americans had already taken away most of the V2 rocket technology from the German underground Mittelwerk factory at the Mittelbau-Dora concentration camp near Nordhausen. Before the Soviets took control of that area, the British were given the opportunity to gather material. They were able to assemble parts sufficient to build eight V2 rockets. Some parts were still missing and there was a search throughout Germany. Some 400 railway cars and 70 Lancaster flights were used to bring the quarter-of-a-million parts and 60 specialized vehicles to Cuxhaven, the most elusive parts being batteries to operate the guidance gyros. The US supplied some tail assemblies from those that they had taken. Many of the rockets and the hydrogen peroxide fuel used in the operation were provided by T-Force, a secretive British Army unit that had, in spring and summer 1945, searched for German military technology and scientists.

The handling and launch procedures were unknown, so German personnel were ordered to perform these, which for the most part they did willingly. The launches were filmed and because the personnel wore their original uniforms and the rockets were painted in near to their original livery, this footage (often used for documentaries) has been mistaken for footage of wartime German launches.

Launches

According to the Report on Operation Backfire, there were three Cuxhaven launches. Backfire Rocket One was prepared for launch on 1 October 1945, but did not function. Backfire Rocket Two was prepared for launch on 2 October 1945 and was launched without difficulty. The second Cuxhaven launch took place on 4 October 1945 with Backfire Rocket One. A third and final rocket was launched for representatives of the press and Allies on 15 October 1945 under the name Operation Clitterhouse.

Aftermath

During and after the launches, the British attempted to recruit German personnel, even those transferred from US custody and due to be returned, to assist with their own missile programme.

The technical aspects of the operation were detailed in a five-volume report.

At the site of the former launchpad there is a trough and some remnants of shelters.

See also
 Arthur Rudolph
 Operation Paperclip
 Remnants of launchpads in Germany
 Rocket experiments in the area of Cuxhaven

References

External links

 Die vergessenen Raketenexperimente von Cuxhaven (The forgotten rocket experiments of Cuxhaven) 
 V2ROCKET.COM - The A-4/V-2 Resource Site - The V-2 Rocket
 

World War II guided missiles of Germany
Non-combat military operations involving the United Kingdom
Intelligence of World War II
Intelligence operations
Research and development in Nazi Germany